Aulophorus is a genus of Naididae.

The genus was described in 1861 by L. K. Schmarda.

Species:
 Aulophorus africanus (Michaelsen, 1914)
 Aulophorus barbatus (Righi & Hamoui, 2002)
 Aulophorus beadlei (Stephenson, 1931)
 Aulophorus bimagnasetus (Harman, 1974)
 Aulophorus borellii (Michaelsen, 1900)
 Aulophorus caraibicus (Michaelsen, 1933)
 Aulophorus carteri (Stephenson, 1931)
 Aulophorus costatus (Du Bois-Reymond Marcus, 1944)
 Aulophorus flabelliger (Stephenson, 1931)
 Aulophorus furcatus (Müller, 1774)
 Aulophorus ghanensis (Hrabĕ, 1966)
 Aulophorus gravelyi (Stephenson, 1925)
 Aulophorus heptabrachionus (Liang, 1958)
 Aulophorus huaronensis (Piguet, 1928)
 Aulophorus hymanae (Naidu, 1962)
 Aulophorus indicus (Naidu, 1962)
 Aulophorus kalina (Righi, 2002)
 Aulophorus lodeni (Brinkhurst, 1986)
 Aulophorus moghei (Naidu & Srivastava, 1980)
 Aulophorus opistocystoides (Nesemann, Shah & Tachamo, 2007)
 Aulophorus pectinatus (Stephenson, 1931)
 Aulophorus schmardai (Michaelsen, 1905)
 Aulophorus superterrenus (Michaelsen, 1912)
 Aulophorus tonkinensis (Vejdovský, 1894)
 Aulophorus tridentatus (Hrabĕ, 1966)
 Aulophorus vagus (Leidy, 1880)
 Aulophorus varians (Liang, 1958)

References

Tubificina